Emarginula huzardii is a species of sea snail, a marine gastropod mollusk in the family Fissurellidae, the keyhole limpets.

Description
Emarginula huzardii is a small keyhole limpet, with a depressed, oblong-ovate shell no longer than 16.8 mm, the breadth 8 mm and the height 2.5 to 4 mm. The minute apex is slightly recurved. The straight posterior slope is half the length of the convex front slope.  The exhalant slit is narrow, about one-fifth to one-sixth the length of the shell. A narrow callus extends from the apex to the slit. The surface is reticulated with 25 - 28 alternately larger and smaller radiating riblets and delicately raised concentric laminae. These form compressed scales on the ribs and cut the interstices into pits. The side margin is finely denticulated and arched so that the shell rests upon the ends only.

Distribution
This species has only been found in the Mediterranean Sea and the Adriatic Sea, living on infralittoral hard substrates.

References

 Sherborn, C.D., 1922 Index Animalium. Part I. Introduction, Bibliography, p. 1-131
 Gofas, S.; Le Renard, J.; Bouchet, P. (2001). Mollusca, in: Costello, M.J. et al. (Ed.) (2001). European register of marine species: a check-list of the marine species in Europe and a bibliography of guides to their identification. Collection Patrimoines Naturels, 50: pp. 180–213

External links
 Payraudeau B. C. (1826). Catalogue descriptif et méthodique des Annelides et des Mollusques de l'île de Corse. Paris, 218 pp. + 8 pl.

Fissurellidae
Gastropods described in 1826